Greensburg Carnegie Public Library, also known as Greensburg City Hall, is a historic Carnegie library located at Greensburg, Decatur County, Indiana. It was built in 1904, and is a one-story, cruciform plan, tan brick building in the Classical Revival style. It is topped by a red terra cotta tiled gable roof and central drum and saucer dome. It features a projecting front portico supported by paired Ionic order columns.  Its construction and furnishing was funded by a $15,000 grant provided by Andrew Carnegie.

It was added to the National Register of Historic Places in 1995.

The library operates today under the name Greensburg-Decatur County Public Library.

See also
List of Carnegie libraries in Indiana

References

External links

Carnegie libraries in Indiana
Libraries on the National Register of Historic Places in Indiana
Neoclassical architecture in Indiana
Library buildings completed in 1904
Buildings and structures in Decatur County, Indiana
National Register of Historic Places in Decatur County, Indiana